The Dodge Daytona is an automobile which was produced by the Chrysler Corporation under their Dodge division from 1984 until 1993. It was a front-wheel drive hatchback based on the Chrysler G platform, which was derived from the Chrysler K platform. The Chrysler Laser was an upscale rebadged version of the Daytona. The Daytona was restyled for 1987, and again for 1992. It replaced the Mitsubishi Galant-based Challenger, and slotted between the Charger and the Conquest.  The Daytona was replaced by the 1995 Dodge Avenger, which was built by Mitsubishi Motors. The Daytona derives its name mainly from the Dodge Charger Daytona, which itself was named after the Daytona 500 race in Daytona Beach, Florida.

History
The Daytona originally used the 2.2 L Chrysler K engine in naturally aspirated or turbocharged form. Power outputs are  respectively. The , 2.5-litre K engine was added for 1986. The 1984 Daytona was available in three trim lines: standard, Turbo and Turbo Z. Total production was 49,347. The Daytona Turbo was on Car and Driver magazine's 10Best list for 1984. Both the Daytona and Chrysler Laser were available with the Chrysler electronic voice alert system through 1987. A performance oriented "Shelby" version of the Daytona was introduced in 1987.

1984
The Daytona debuted with a 142 hp Turbo I motor. Many Turbo Z models were produced and were more luxurious than other years due to their use of Mark Cross leather, light up speakers, and rear amplifier switches. These options were dropped after 1984.

1985
Changes were minimal for the Daytona's second year of production. The Turbo Z model was no longer listed as a package but was now a model in its own right. The wraparound spoiler, formerly exclusive to the Turbo Z model, was now offered on all three models. But the biggest change was under the hood: the 2.2 Turbo was given four more hp to 146 hp (109 kW), and a new shift linkage was added. Optional "Swiss cheese" wheels were replaced with new optional "pizza" wheels. All wheels now had five lug nuts (instead of four). Total production was 47,519.

1986

There were several changes for the 1986 Daytona. The middle "Turbo" model was dropped, leaving only two models, the base and Turbo Z. Engine changes were also made, including a new 2.5 L 100 hp (75 kW) four-cylinder engine for the base model. A new T-roof package was added to the option list, and 5,984 Daytona owners chose this option. The biggest addition was the C/S (Carroll Shelby) suspension package, available only as an option on the Turbo Z. This consisted of  front and  rear anti-sway bars, performance tuned struts, and 225/50VR15 Goodyear Eagle Gatorback tires. This package would foreshadow the Daytona Shelby of 1987 and beyond. Some 7,704 owners added this handling package to their Daytonas. Total production this year was 44,366.

1987–1988

For 1987, the Daytona was restyled externally, and featured pop-up headlights. New in 1987 was a Shelby Z trim level with an available Chrysler developed Turbo II intercooled version of the 2.2 L Chrysler K engine, as well as a heavy-duty A555 transaxle with Getrag gears. The Shelby Z also featured numerous suspension upgrades, including a larger diameter front sway bar and disc brakes on all four wheels. This version was sold in Europe under the name Chrysler GS Turbo II. A more luxury-oriented Pacifica trim line was also added to replace the Chrysler Laser, which was dropped in mid-year 1986. Among the optional equipment included a leather interior, eight-way power enthusiast driver's seat (with mechanical thigh and lumbar controls), digital instrument cluster, and a 12-button trip computer (with instant fuel ratings as well as trip averages and estimated travel times). In 1988, the C/S package was revived. However, this time the C/S was only available on the base model Daytona. In order to reduce weight and produce a lighter Daytona, the C/S came without the ground effects and other features that were on the Shelby. The AGB model C/S had a Turbo I 2.2 L engine, which was available with either an automatic or manual transmission.

Decepzione
Following the Chrysler takeover of Lamborghini, product programs general manager Jack Stavana introduced a program to fit a Lamborghini Jalpa V8 into a Daytona. The motor was linked to an all-wheel drive (AWD) system designed by Lotus UK and the car was called the Decepzione. Despite its performance and media buzz generated by articles in Car and Driver magazine, the project was discontinued because of the engine's oil pan having just  of ground clearance, necessitated by the comparatively tall engine block.

1989–1991

For the 1989 model year, the ES model was introduced. The ES model was an appearance package/equipment group offered on base models in order to attract the "average" Daytona buyer’s eye without a major price hike. It featured silver contrasting ground effects, along with "snowflake" patterned alloy wheels. The 2.2 L Turbo I was replaced with the 2.5 L Turbo I, rated at 150 hp and 180 ft. lbs. of torque. Also introduced in 1989 was the AGS C/S Competition model, which was featured along with the regular AGB model. This new C/S model featured an intercooled 2.2 L Turbo II engine, along with many other features that were also on the Shelby. However, this model was only available with a manual transmission. The AGS C/S package would remain in availability until 1991. The AGB C/S Performance model had the 2.5 L non-intercooled Turbo I engine available with five-speed manual or three-speed automatic. A driver's side airbag was standard.  

For 1990, all Daytonas received an interior restyling, featuring a modernized cockpit-style wraparound dashboard. A variable nozzle turbocharger (VNT Turbo IV), borrowed from the 1989 Shelby CSX VNT, was offered in the Shelby model producing the same  as the Turbo II but eliminated turbo lag and improved drivability. Also for 1990, a 3.0 L SOHC Mitsubishi V6 was made available. 

For 1991, the 2.2 L turbocharged engine was dropped in favor of the new 2.5 L "high torque" turbocharged engine. Although sporting a lesser power output of 152 hp, this engine offered 210 ft. lbs. of torque, exceeding that of the Turbo II. Also new was the addition of an IROC model with either the 3.0 L V6 or turbocharged 2.5 L engine. Visually, IROC models differed from lesser models, having a ground effects kit and alloy wheels, among other differences. The IROC decals where added in halfway through 1991 even though all Shelby Daytonas from 1991 were considered to be IROCs. There is no difference between a 1991 Shelby and an IROC besides the decals and the letter "J" in the VIN sequence; on 1991 Daytona Shelbys, the VIN has the sequence G74J and IROC models have the sequence G743.

1992–1993

For the 1992 model year, production was moved from the St. Louis, Missouri plant to the Sterling Heights, Michigan plant. The Daytona also received a thorough facelift, which replaced the pop-up headlights with flush-mounted rounded ones and added a new grille and rear fascia.  Window surround moldings on the doors were also new, and rounder than the sharp angles of the moldings on 1984 to 1991 models. The 1992 model also displayed the new Dodge "ram head" emblem on the hood and below the taillights. While the 3.0 L V6 became an option on lower end models, it was the standard engine on IROC models. Optional on the 1992 IROC was the 2.5 L "High Torque" Turbo, available as a very rare option (less than 230 produced). Also available on the IROC was the new R/T performance package, which featured a  Turbo III version of the 2.2 L four-cylinder, but with a Lotus designed DOHC cylinder head and direct ignition system instead of a distributor-type ignition system; this engine was shared with the Dodge Spirit R/T. Although the Shelby trim was discontinued after 1991 (due to the end of Carroll Shelby's involvement with Chrysler), a small number of 1992 Daytona IROCs were produced bearing the Shelby name. These IROCs featured "Shelby" decals which were added at the dealership or later to help boost sales. All were 2.5 Turbo cars as they featured the Shelby Performance Package sales code. These were superseded by the IROC package. Shelby versions were mainly "Chrysler" branded Daytonas which were sold overseas and were part of an early run of IROCs. These were the last production vehicles produced by Chrysler to bear the Shelby name. Production of the Daytona ended on February 26, 1993 without an immediate replacement. The 1995 Dodge Avenger eventually took the Daytona's place.

Production Figures:

Chrysler Laser 

The Chrysler Laser was billed as the Chrysler brand's first sports car, while the 1950s and 1960s Chrysler 300 letter series coupes and convertibles were very powerful and fast at the time. The Laser was a virtual clone of the Dodge Daytona, but came only in the upscale trim version. It was produced from 1984 to 1986. The Laser emphasized European luxury, and was intended to be an "executive personal luxury coupe". The Laser was sleek, low-slung, and aerodynamic, with a drag coefficient of 0.35. The car had a large rear hatchback, with a rear deck-lid spoiler. The 1984 Laser was available in two trim lines: standard and XE. In mid-1985, the XT trim was added as the top-of-the-line version. The standard, XE and XT trim lines would continue until the Laser’s demise in mid-1986. After 1986, the Daytona was exported to Canada as the Chrysler Daytona, officially ending Canadian Daytona sales under the Dodge marque. The turbo version of the Laser could be recognized by its use of black hood louvers. The 2.2 L Turbo I engine was available as standard equipment in the XE and XT trim lines and optional on the standard model. The Laser was replaced by the Mitsubishi built Chrysler Conquest, a rear-wheel drive vehicle which competed directly against the Toyota Celica Supra. The Laser name was silently terminated after the first half of 1986 model year, then resurrected for the 1990 model year as the Plymouth Laser, built by Diamond Star Motors, a joint venture between Chrysler and Mitsubishi. The rebranded Laser shared its body and chassis with the Eagle Talon and Mitsubishi Eclipse.

In 1987, the Chrysler LeBaron coupe was restyled as a more proper sports car, removing Chrysler's need for the Laser. However, the Laser’s luxury performance image would be carried over into the 1987 Dodge Daytona Pacifica as well as the Lancer Pacifica and other Dodge vehicles styled by Chrysler's Pacifica Studios.

The Laser was specified to have an estimated  city/ highway fuel mileage. Chrysler offered a five-year or  warranty, or a protection plan with outer body rust-through protection, based on United States Automobile Club tests. Mark Cross leather seats and a six-way power option were available as options.

Notable features of the Chrysler Laser XE included: 
A dashboard with digital readouts for the speedometer, tachometer, odometer, temperature, oil pressure, voltage, and fuel
An electronic monitoring system situated near the top of the center console. This monitoring system checked 22 separate functions on the car, such as an open door, low fuel, or a blown taillight, and would give a digital readout of the situation, along with an audio message produced by a synthesized voice.
An electronic navigator, which would give information on fuel mileage, miles traveled, distance to destination, and elapsed driving time

Production numbers
1984 - 59,858 (Laser- 33,976/Laser XE- 25,882)
1985 - 50,866 (Laser- 29,221/Laser XE- 18,193/Laser XT- 3,452)
1986 - 36,672 (Laser- 14,134/Laser XE- 15,549/Laser XT- 6,989)

References

External links

 TurboMopar Discussion Forum
 Allpar.com Daytona/Laser page
 What's It Like To Drive - Describes a test between two Dodge Daytonas, one FWD and one RWD
 Front-Runners.net - Daytona Road Test PDF

Daytona
Front-wheel-drive sports cars
Hatchbacks
1990s cars
Cars introduced in 1983
Cars discontinued in 1993